Muğanlı, Zangilan may refer to:
Muğanlı (39° 09' N 46° 39' E), Zangilan 
Muğanlı (39° 05' N 46° 47' E), Zangilan